Ipermestra (Hypermnestra) is an opera by the composer Christoph Willibald Gluck. It takes the form of an opera seria in three acts. The Italian-language libretto is by Pietro Metastasio. The opera premiered on 21 November 1744 at the Teatro San Giovanni Grisostomo in Venice. Ipermestra is the first of Gluck's operas to survive complete.

Roles

References
The Viking Opera Guide, ed. Amanda Holden (Viking, 1993), p. 371.
Alfred Wotquenne Catalogue thématique des œuvres de Chr. W. v. Gluck (Georg Olms Verlag, 1967)

1744 operas
Italian-language operas
Operas by Christoph Willibald Gluck
Operas